Repertory  is the theatrical programming model.
Repertory'''also may refer to:
 Homeopathic repertory , aspect of the eponymous therapeutic system
 The "New-England Repertory", 19th-century Massachusetts newspaper
 Repertory (London)'',  each of the respective series of historical records, of two "courts"  governing that city